The Washington Nationals are a Major League Baseball (MLB) franchise based in Washington, D.C. They play in the National League East division. The team was known as the Montreal Expos from 1969 to 2004. The first game of the new baseball season for a team is played on Opening Day, and being named the Opening Day starter is an honor, which is often given to the player who is expected to lead the pitching staff that season, though there are various strategic reasons why a team's best pitcher might not start on Opening Day. The Nationals have used six different Opening Day starting pitchers in their sixteen seasons. The six starters have a combined Opening Day record of 3 win, 9 losses and 4 no decisions. No decisions are awarded to the starting pitcher if the game is won or lost after the starting pitcher has left the game, or if the starting pitcher does not pitch at least five innings with the lead. The overall Opening Day record of the team is 7–9.

Max Scherzer holds the franchise record for most Opening Day starts with five. He is 1–3 on Opening Day, with one no decision.

Liván Hernández is the only pitcher to make an Opening Day start for both the Expos and the Nationals.

As the Washington Nationals, the team played their home games at Robert F. Kennedy Stadium from 2005 to 2007; their only home opener there was a 9–2 loss in 2007 by starter John Patterson. Nationals Park is the team's current field, and it was the site of the team's 2008 season opener, with starting pitcher Odalis Pérez on the mound in a game that the Nationals won 3–2 over the visiting Atlanta Braves.

Key

Pitchers

References 

Opening day starters
Lists of Major League Baseball Opening Day starting pitchers